Stal Rzeszów is a Polish motorcycle speedway club. The team currently competes in the Polish Speedway Second League (2. Liga) and have won the Team Speedway Polish Championship twice.

History

1948 to 1959
The first speedway in Rzeszów was held at the Resovia stadium in 1948. The club made their league debut during the 1949 Polish speedway season under the name RTKM-Gwardia Rzeszów. 

As Stal Rzeszów the team returned to league action in 1955 and in 1956, two clubs from Rzeszów competed in the league, with Resovia Rzeszów competing in addition to Stal.

Towards the end of the 1950s the team won the second division twice in 1957 and 1959. The 1959 success was a precursor of things to come.

1960 to 1969 
The 1960s proved to be a golden period for the club, as Stal Rzeszów won the gold medal in the Team Speedway Polish Championship in 1960 and 1961. They also secured silver medals in 1962 and 1963. Florian Kapała was the star rider winning Polish Individual Speedway Championship in 1961 and 1962 and the Golden Helmet in 1962. A further medal was won in 1966, when the team won the bronze medal.

1970 to 1999
The 1970s and 1980s proved to be a low point because the success of the previous decade could not be reproduced. The team failed to win anything until 1981 and that was a second division title. Another barren spell ensued, until 1991 and another second division title success. The team had their best season for over 30 years, when they won a bronze medal during the 1998 Polish speedway season.

2000 to present 

When the Ekstraliga was introduced in 2000, Rzeszów were in 1. Liga. 

In 2005, the club provided a major shock when winning the Polish Pairs Speedway Championship as a second tier club, although they also won the second division too. The pairs success was achieved by Dariusz Śledz and Maciej Kuciapa.

In recent years the team has competed in the lower divisions winning 1. Liga in 2010 and 2014 and the 2. Liga in 2018.

Teams

2023 team
  Jacob Thorssell 
  Peter Kildemand 
  Jonas Jeppesen 
  Marcin Nowak 
  Eduard Krčmář 
  Kevin Wölbert
  Mateusz Tudzieź 
  Rafał Karczmarz 
  Anže Grmek
  Philip Hellström Bängs
  Anders Rowe
  Mateusz Majcher

Previous teams

2022 team'

  Eduard Krčmář 
  Kevin Wölbert
  Dawid Lampart 
  Timi Salonen
  Hubert Legowik
  Paweł Miesiąc 
  Szymon Bandur

Notable riders

Honours

References 

 
 
 

Polish speedway teams
Sport in Rzeszów
Stal Rzeszów